{{DISPLAYTITLE:C30H17Cl}}

The molecular formula C30H17Cl (molar mass: 412.91 g/mol) may refer to:
 1-Chloro-9,10-bis(phenylethynyl)anthracene, a fluorescent dye
 2-Chloro-9,10-bis(phenylethynyl)anthracene, a fluorescent dye